This was the second edition of the tournament. There was no defending champion as the tournament was canceled at the quarterfinals stage due to the COVID-19 pandemic.

Marc-Andrea Hüsler and Zdeněk Kolář won the title after defeating Peter Polansky and Brayden Schnur 6–4, 2–6, [10–4] in the final.

Seeds

Draw

References

External links
 Main draw

Potchefstroom Open - Doubles